Siguaraya TV is a Venezuelan community television channel.  It was created in March 2006 and can be seen in the community of Acarigua in the Páez Municipality of the Portuguesa State of Venezuela on UHF channel 53.  Rafael Peña is the legal representative of the foundation that owns this channel.

As of now, Siguaraya TV does not have a website.

See also
List of Venezuelan television channels

Television networks in Venezuela
Television stations in Venezuela
Television channels and stations established in 2006
2006 establishments in Venezuela
Television in Venezuela
Spanish-language television stations